The Corporation for Digital Scholarship (CDS) is a nonprofit technology organization based in Vienna, Virginia, dedicated to developing open-source software for researchers and cultural heritage institutions. It was created in 2009 at the Roy Rosenzweig Center for History and New Media at George Mason University with initial funding from the Andrew W. Mellon Foundation, the United States Institute of Museum and Library Services, and the Alfred P. Sloan Foundation.

Supported projects 
As of 2016, CDS funded the development of the reference management tool Zotero while it was maintained by the Rosenzweig center. Starting in 2021, the project was transferred to CDS.

As of 2022, CDS maintains Zotero, Omeka (for digital archiving), Tropy (for managing photographs of physical collections), PressForward (a WordPress plugin for maintaining content hubs), and Sourcery (a mobile app and community for digitizing archival collections).

External links 

Information technology organizations based in North America
Vienna, Virginia
2009 establishments in Virginia